The Green Temptation is a lost 1922 American silent melodrama film directed by William Desmond Taylor and starring Betty Compson. It was written by Julia Crawford Ivers and Monte Katterjohn based upon the short story "The Noose" by Constance Lindsay Skinner.

Plot
Betty plays a girl who is involved in the Paris criminal underworld. During World War I she becomes a wartime Red Cross nurse and after the war leaves for America for a new start in life. There she meets an old wartime colleague (Kosloff), a criminal who is conniving to steal a valuable jewel called 'The Green Temptation'. Kosloff wants Betty to help him steal the jewel and when she balks he threatens to reveal her sordid past to her new American friends. Scotland Yard detective (Mahlon Hamilton), probably hired to protect the jewel, is sweet on Betty and kills Kosloff when he tries to steal the jewel.

The film has a similarity to von Stroheim's Foolish Wives released that same year.

Cast
Betty Compson as Genelle / Coralyn / Joan Parker
Mahlon Hamilton as John Allenby
Theodore Kosloff as Gaspard
Neely Edwards as Pitou
Edmund Burns as Hugh Duyker (credited as Edward Burns)
Lenore Lynard as Duchesse de Chazarin
Mary Thurman as Dolly Dunton
William von Hardenburg as Monsieur Jounet
Betty Brice as Mrs. Weedon Duyker
Arthur Hull as Mr. Weedon Duyker

Production
The Green Temptation was released posthumously following the unsolved murder of its director William Desmond Taylor on February 1, 1922.

References

External links

Lobby card and poster

1922 films
American silent feature films
Films directed by William Desmond Taylor
Lost American films
Paramount Pictures films
1922 drama films
Silent American drama films
American black-and-white films
Melodrama films
Films set in Paris
American World War I films
1922 lost films
1920s American films